The 2009 Kirkuk bombing was a suicide car bomb attack that occurred on June 30, 2009, in the northern Iraqi city of Kirkuk. The bombing killed 40 people and injured up to 100.

The bomb, which exploded in a crowded district came as U.S. troops were leaving major urban cities in Iraq.

Shortly after the attack, a Peshmerga brigade seized a car loaded with 250 kg of TNT. The explosives were being transported from Kirkuk to Sulaymaniyah.

Reaction
Iraqi President Jalal Talabani condemned the attack.

References

2009 murders in Iraq
21st-century mass murder in Iraq
Suicide car and truck bombings in Iraq
Terrorist incidents in Iraq in 2009
Mass murder in 2009
June 2009 events in Iraq